Čajkov is a village and municipality in the Levice District in the Nitra Region of south-west Slovakia.

The village is known for its vineyards and wine production.

A one-day festival of contemporary electronic dance music called Debercha project takes place in Čajkov annually.

History
In historical records the village was first mentioned in 1276.

Geography
The village lies at an altitude of 188 metres and covers an area of 23.939 km².
It has a population of about 1030 people.

Facilities
The village has a gym, a  football pitch and a tennis court

Genealogical resources

The records for genealogical research are available at the state archive "Statny Archiv in Nitra, Slovakia"

 Roman Catholic church records (births/marriages/deaths): 1721-1896 (parish A)

See also
 List of municipalities and towns in Slovakia

External links
Obec v okrese Levice
 Obec Čajkov v regionálnom portáli Leviceonline.sk
 Obec Čajkov v regionálnom portáli Levičan.sk
http://www.statistics.sk/mosmis/eng/run.html
Surnames of living people in Cajkov

Villages and municipalities in Levice District